Christopher William Clayton Hutton (1893–1965) a soldier, airman, journalist and inventor, was recruited as an intelligence officer to work for MI9, a branch of the British Military Intelligence, during the Second World War. Known as 'Clutty' to his friends, he was engaged towards the end of 1939 by the War Office to work under Major (later Brigadier) Norman Crockatt, in order to set up and run operations to create and distribute escape and evasion aids for Allied servicemen. Hutton's small team identified suitable manufacturers, ensured supplies and devised methods by which the concealed aids could be sent to prisoner of war camps.

It is estimated that around 35,000 British and other Allied personnel managed to evade capture or escape from captivity and return to Allied territory. Many of these were assisted by MI9's silk maps and other escape and evasion equipment.

Hutton achieved all of his wartime escape and evasion work despite shortages of materials such as silk and steel wire; he also overcame much bureaucratic obstruction. He was often in trouble with the police and with official supply authorities of various kinds, but was unreservedly backed by Crockatt. Hutton was always short of money and after WWII he wrote a book about his wartime experiences, which he believed was reasonable since there had been many stories about escapes in the newspapers, as well as open sales of items such as silk maps. But to his own apparent surprise, he encountered difficulties with the security authorities who were nervous about revelations by former members of the secret or semi-secret services.

Personal life
Clayton Hutton was born at 102 Willow Road, Birmingham, on 16 November 1893, the son of Christopher Hutton, brass manufacturer, and his wife, Edith Eliza, née Clayton. From January 1904 to December 1908, Hutton attended King Edward's School, Birmingham. His father, C. Hutton, registered him at the school from the address: 2 West Donald Place, Washwood Heath Road, Saltley, Birmingham. In Class 11, July 1907, Hutton won First Prize for Botany, and came Second in Class for Drawing. Hutton did not appear to excel at team games but we read in King Edward's School Chronicle, New Series Vol XXIII, July 1908, 
No. 170, page 59; Gymnastic Competition – First in Class IX – "Hutton has greatly improved during the year."

Hutton's uncle, William Clayton, ran a timber business and sawmills in Saltley, then on the outskirts of Birmingham, where his nephew worked on leaving school. It was from there, in April 1913, that the stunt of Houdini's faked escape from a wooden packing case was planned, with a wager by the young Hutton and his mates. This event strengthened his fascination with both stage performances and escapology. Hutton says that he was "discouraged by his mother" from going onto the stage professionally. In the same context he mentions entering journalism, but the chronology is unclear from his sketchy account and perhaps his WWI service intervened.

Hutton served in the First World War He was described as a forceful character who worked ceaselessly to overcome both technical and bureaucratic obstacles when inspired by an idea. Near the start of WWI he tried to enter the Royal Flying Corps but was rejected. On 26 December 1914 he was commissioned into the South Lancashire Regiment. After a few months he transferred into the Northumberland Fusiliers, where he served with the 25th battalion (2nd Tyneside Irish) for most of 1915. He then again transferred into the Yorkshire Regiment, becoming a captain in its 13th battalion and then briefly an adjutant. His final WWI army posting was as captain and adjutant of the 10th battalion of the training reserve. He gained a British flying certificate dated 9 May 1917, registered as Christopher Clayton Hutton, captain in the RFC; giving his address as Wisteria, Castle Bromwich, Nr Birmingham. Finally, on the formation of the Royal Air Force in April 1918, he was appointed an RAF Staff Captain, serving in Salonica. After two months' administration work, he passed military pilot training, and served briefly on that front, being demobilised in January 1919.

According to his biographer, M. R. D. Foot, Hutton held a variety of short-term jobs, including that of a newspaper reporter. This ties in with Hutton's own short account, when he says that he learnt the work of a journalist under Lord Northcliffe, moving on to the Daily Chronicle "for a long spell." And he then moved into the film industry, working in publicity. At some stage whilst doing this work, he lived briefly in Berlin.

Early in WWII he found his niche, thanks to showing his interviewer proof of his encounter with Houdini – aged nineteen Clayton Hutton had bet Houdini that the latter could not get out of a wooden crate built by one of his uncle's workmen. Unknown to the lads at the factory until later, Houdini bribed the workman to make the crate largely from false nails, and so won the bet. After a brief interview at the War Office he was appointed together with four others, to help Norman Crockatt set up a new section in the secret service department MI9. Their tasks included training fighting men in how to evade capture or escape if they found themselves in enemy-held territory and, a little later in the war, supporting escape and evasion lines, and interrogating returned prisoners. Hutton's function was to provide evasion and escape devices. He was recommissioned in May 1940 as a captain on the general list of the army; was promoted major in 1943; and was then allowed to retire into plain clothes, but still bound under the Official Secrets Act.

When Hutton began his MI9 duties, escape and evasion activities under Crockatt were based in Room 424 of the Hotel Metropole, Northumberland Avenue, London. However, Hutton himself kept away from the building as much as possible. According to his own account, this was on the instructions of Crockatt. So he found himself a small room in the War Office buildings as his base. As the result of a dispersion policy in October 1940 the whole outfit was removed to Wilton Park, Beaconsfield, Buckinghamshire.  Hutton records that he was given an office so palatial that it would have satisfied Cecil B. de Mille. He was also granted a woman driver, who admitted that she had been warned that Hutton was mad! Evidently though, according to his own story, they got on together quite well. Later in his service, probably during 1943 when he was showing signs of stress from overwork, he found himself a hideaway in an excavated "bunker" near a graveyard somewhere beyond the grounds of Wilton Park mansion.  There he took his equipment and materials to continue working, undisturbed.

Escape and evasion equipment
Brigadier Norman Crockatt headed MI9 throughout its existence and set out the Branch's philosophy of "escape-mindedness" which became the focus of the training programme. It was emphasised that it was every man's duty to try to escape and they were told that MI9 would do everything they could to support them in that endeavour. Shortly after his recruitment by MI9, Hutton met "Johnny" Evans, who was also employed by the organisation. Evans appears to have made a strong impression on Hutton. Evans "lectured" Hutton, emphasising that the three essentials for an escaper are: maps, compasses and a food-source. Later, Hutton realised that Evans should have added a safe water supply with the food.

Crockatt had given Hutton a free hand to decide how to organise his work and choose its priorities. The meeting with Evans led Hutton to decide to concentrate on the three essentials of maps, compasses and food packs for all service personnel going into battle. Furthermore, he realised that a study of books about WW1 experiences would provide further insights. Short of time and eager to forge ahead, he requested the librarian at the British Museum to assemble a collection of escape books from WW1 and to provide assistance to purchase second-hand copies. He took these books to the headmaster of Rugby School, Crockatt's alma mater, and arranged for sixth formers to write summaries. Hence he obtained a very swift appraisal of the main necessities. Further help came from a Colonel Scott  in the War Office who gave Hutton the script of a lecture by General Walther von Brauchitsch, in Munich in 1937, describing German experiences of running prison camps in 1914–18. Thus Hutton's priorities soon became very clear.

In 1942, Clayton Hutton's Section in MI9 produced a top secret booklet named Per Ardua Libertas. This contained illustrations of escape and evasion maps and other aids. Copies were passed to a visiting delegation of American Intelligence Officers.

Fabric maps
Hutton is credited with the re-invention of the use of silk for an escape and evasion map. He considered maps to be "the escaper's most important accessory" that should be issued to all flyers. Evidently cloth maps as an escape aid were not a completely new idea.  Hutton's idea was that every serviceman should be issued with a compact map as one of three essential escape aids against the eventuality of being captured or shot down behind enemy lines. Hence he could attempt to evade capture or escape from detention. Hutton was surprised to discover that a man called Wallace Ellison, with whom he was acquainted, was not only a silk manufacturer in Macclesfield, but was also the author of a book on prisoners and prison escapes in WWI Germany. As they talked about the objective and the difficulties of silk map production, Ellison became enthusiastic, and was soon providing considerable practical assistance.

At first, Hutton had difficulties obtaining cartographic data. Normal War Office and Air Ministry sources in London were uncooperative. However, when he met the Edinburgh mapmakers John Bartholomew and Son Ltd., they agreed to supply maps of Germany, France, Poland, Italy, Austria, Switzerland, Belgium, the Netherlands and the Balkans, waiving all copyrights in support of the war effort.

Once he had the cartographic sources, he needed a medium onto which he could print the maps. This medium needed to be quiet to unfold, not prone to disintegrate when wet, maintaining its integrity when folded at the crease line and able to be concealed as very small packages. His first attempts to print on silk squares were unsuccessful since the minute details were blurred. However, he discovered that this was cured by adding pectin to the ink. MI9 went on to commission escape and evasion maps on silk, various man-made cloth fibres and special tissue paper. To increase their usefulness, most of these maps were printed double-sided.

A naval intelligence officer operating under the name "Bravada" put Hutton in touch with a source of mulberry leaf paper, used in Japan. The paper maps were printed on tissue made from these leaves. It had the texture of onion skins and showed excellent durability. It could be balled, put in water and soaked, and then flattened without creasing, fading or disintegration. It could be folded up in such a way that it would occupy a very small space, such as inside a chess piece or a record. When he found another printer who normally made greetings cards, Hutton arranged for him to laminate mulberry tissue maps inside playing cards. When soaked in water, these delaminated, revealing serviceable maps of a chosen area, indicated by secret contacts with particular POW camps.

After retiring from the Ministry of Defence (United Kingdom), where she had worked as a cartographer, Barbara Bond carried out a three-year research programme on WWII escape and evasion maps, using primary sources of excellent pedigree. Her research revealed the astonishing scope of the MI9 mapping work. She found that conservatively 243 different mapping items were produced and then printed by the means outlined above. This resulted in more than one and three quarter million maps that were distributed to combatants – principally aircrews, but also special forces such as commandos and SOE personnel. As the initiator of this vital programme, and in his subsequent service until 1943, Hutton was the key personality in this effort.

Compasses
Hutton's work on compasses began around the time of the Dunkirk evacuation crisis. Unsuccessfully contacting several well-known instrument makers for compasses that could be concealed, he then discovered a small firm in the Old Kent Road, London. This was Blunt Brothers, who had a well equipped laboratory and workshops behind an unprepossessing facade. They assured him that they could make 5000 small compasses in a week, but they had a problem with shortage of steel strip. Hutton immediately set about solving this, flying straight away from Croydon Airport to Sheffield. There, using his MI9 credentials and performing some bartering, he was able to purchase the necessary strip, which was delivered almost immediately to Blunts' works.

During the first week, they made simple bar compasses, about one inch (25mm) long with luminous-dotted tips, to hang from any convenient piece of thread. Next, a very tiny prototype was made, having a barrel cut from 1/4-inch (6mm) dia. brass tubing. They realised that with an outer screw thread, these could fit into the reverse of military uniform buttons and cap badges. This went into production and later, when the enemy discovered this device, more were produced with a left-hand thread, which fooled the inspecting guards for some time longer. Hutton got on well with George Waterlow and Dick Richards, two of Blunts' instrument makers, and together they also developed the idea of magnetised safety razor blades. These pointed north when suspended or floated on water. 

When there was a shortage of steel points for the better-quality barrel compasses, they hit on cutting these from readily-available gramophone needles. Then, in December 1940, Blunts' factory was bombed, and the owners feared losing all their production for some time, because of the likely bureaucratic delay before re-building could start. But undeterred, Hutton appealed directly to Lord Beaverbrook to have repairs made immediately. This was successful, probably helped by the fact that the firm was also making bomb sights.

The following selection of hidden compass devices are illustrated in Hutton's autobiography Official Secret
 Gillette safety razor set, with case; razor handle contains hidden compass and space for map; pack of magnetised blades.
 Compasses concealed in collar studs.
 A magnetised pencil clip: a dimple on the balance point acted as a pencil-tip gimbal.
 Wooden pencil stub containing magnetised rod hidden beneath the lead.
 The Mk.IV RAF ration pack included a good-quality compass and a miniature clock hidden in the screw-threaded stopper.
 A propelling pencil with a hollow barrel: this gadget had three forms of compass and a map space.

Escape boxes
After the fall of France and the Low Countries, the priority for MI9b became support for RAF flights over the greatly enlarged and much closer enemy territories. This meant that provision of emergency food-packs for aircrews was of the utmost importance. Crockatt approved of Hutton working on this, but warned him that they would be "poaching" on the preserves of the Quartermaster general.

Hutton's first escape packs used cigarette tins as the container. He placed a huge order for 20,000 full "Flat Fifty" tins of cigarettes with W.D. & H.O. Wills of Bristol.  For several days, he packed and un-packed the tins until he found the best way of fitting in the concentrated food and other items useful to an escaper. Showing his first efforts to Johnny Evans, the latter pointed out that a safe water supply was also necessary. Hutton tried again, finding the cigarette tins rather small for anything other than a rubber bottle of limited capacity. But amazingly, as well as concentrated food, he also managed eventually to pack in two paper maps, a tiny saw, a compass and Benzedrine tablets.

These types of pack were issued for service as "RAF Ration Box Mk.II," but one of the RAF units that received them reported that a pilot who had bailed out in the English Channel found the contents had been spoiled by leakage. The RAF Ration Pack Mk.IV was more successful than the tins. This round drum-shaped design was developed in clear plastic by Halex Ltd., toothbrush manufacturers, after Hutton asked Sir. Laurence Merriam, the chairman, for assistance. It was specifically designed to be watertight and compact. The user was instructed to empty the contents into his pockets and fill the container with water when required. Another type of escape box is illustrated in Foot & Langley (1979), p. 58. This box is broadly rectangular in plan shape, opening into two-halves, but with a curve moulded into the cross-section to fit the chest of the wearer.  No Model Number is given, but it is inferred that this was an American design, probably used in Europe, from around 1942 onward.

Uniforms and clothing
Examples from the escape books of the 1914–18 war led Hutton to consider convertible uniforms. RAF uniforms might be altered to resemble those of the Luftwaffe and those of other services could be imitated similarly. Military personnel were entitled to receive new uniforms in the POW camps, so Hutton devised a form of reversible uniform that could be sent in this way. It had a tailored lining of a darker material than that of the exterior. When unbuttoned this served as a stand-alone civilian jacket.

Another technique was to include hidden cutting markings on blankets. These were an obvious item for the enemy to expect relatives to include in parcels for prisoners. Hutton selected the best type of dual-purpose cloth for this purpose, consulting experts from the Wool Association. Marking patterns were applied in invisible ink that would show when the blanket was soaked in cold water. POW camps always contained tailors who were adept at the necessary alterations. Concealed dyes, also devised in Hutton's department, provided further support to the disguises.

Flying boots
The 1943 Pattern 'Escape' boots were the version produced from the designs of Major Clayton Hutton at MI9. These were being field-tested as early as 1942. Consisting of a black leather laced walking shoe and a black zip-up suede legging, the basic principle was simple: in the event of landing in enemy territory, the wearer would separate the leggings from the shoe by using the folded pocket knife that was held in the pocket in the right boot. The walking shoe was less conspicuous and more comfortable than a conventional flying boot. The leggings could be re-assembled to provide a waistcoat for extra warmth. The design remained in service with the RAF until the mid-1950s. Hutton also designed flying boots with hollow heels to hide maps and other escape equipment.

Saws
The determined escaper often needed a means of cutting through the iron window-bars of a prison. Hutton mentions "a tiny saw" among the contents of the RAF Ration Box Mk.II, but this must indeed have been very small to fit into the cigarette tin alongside other objects. Foot & Langley say that MI9 produced "several formidable hacksaws." One was a blade 4 1/2 in. long x 1/2 in. wide, having a hole in one end through which string could be tied when it was concealed in clothing – evidently, then, a tool for escapers rather than evaders. The escape knife, which they credit to Hutton – although the latter does not himself mention it – was a robust multi-function tool that included a sawblade. It must have been a prized item in prison camps, provided it escaped detection by X-rays during the guards' inspection.
 
Hiding saws in items such as the seams of clothes or in bootlaces was a difficulty because of the brittleness and stiffness of the steel. Thinking about this problem, Hutton came up with the idea of the Gigli saw. By talking to a friend whose father was a surgeon, he discovered that these could be purchased ready-made and would fit inside a bootlace without adaptation. The surgical saw was chain-like, and had loops at each end to take handles. He bought some samples from a medical instrument supplier, but finding them ideal, he wanted very large quantities. In his usual manner, he set about obtaining enough serrated wire for 10,000 saws from a factory in Birmingham and they were soon put to use.

Other inventions during MI9 service
Some of Hutton's inventions and developments of existing ideas were either taken up in only relatively small quantities or dropped altogether, often at the behest of other branches of the secret services. As described in his autobiography, these gadgets included the following:-
 Miniature wireless sets – interrogation reports from returning escapees indicated to Hutton that wireless sets, capable of being smuggled into camps and then hidden, would be prized by the escape committees. However this was an example of his typical naivete in believing himself free to ignore boundaries of responsibility. He set to work with vigour to obtain samples of potentially suitable radios, including some imported from the USA. Having selected a suitable set, he arranged through a contact in the GPO laboratories to fit it into a simulated cigarette package. But at somewhere around this point, someone in authority got to know what he was up to. When he travelled north with his driver, Jill Warwick, to carry out tests, he was politely but firmly apprehended by policemen on Ilkley Moor. Taken to Leeds, he was warned in no uncertain terms to drop this line of gadgetry. Evidently some other branch, probably the Secret Intelligence Service, already had the matter in hand!       
 Several devices were developed for use by the Special Operations Executive after Hutton met Percy Charles Pickard, the real captain of the Vickers Wellington bomber "F for Freddie" in the 1941 film Target for Tonight.  These inventions included a portable torch, disguised as a bicycle pump, for marking landing strips; another torch, working in a similar manner, but also containing a hollow section to conceal strips of camera film; hemispherical plastic bowls coated on the convex side with phosphorescent paint – to be used as wind direction markers for incoming aircraft.
 Hutton had the idea of concealing a miniature camera within a cigarette lighter.  He had the prototype of the camera-lighter made by Blunts, the London East End firm that had developed miniature compasses. When he obtained photographs of colleagues, completely without their knowledge, there was consternation! Foot & Langley say that these cameras were smuggled into POW camps in Germany and Italy.
 The PIAT gun was a low-cost anti-tank weapon designed in 1942 by Lieut.Col. Stewart Blacker, who enlisted Hutton's assistance (apparently with Crockatt's approval) rapidly to locate the necessary steel tubing and other materials. Hutton was also asked to help, through his contacts, to have a prototype made.
 Miniature blowpipe and darts – Hutton claimed that this idea was developed at the behest of a Free French officer. The idea was for French Resistance personnel and their sympathisers to harass occupying German troops and officials by mingling in crowds and blowing darts made from gramophone needles at their faces or other exposed skin. An untrue rumour would be circulated that the needles had poisoned tips. A prototype was given to the "customer" but Hutton was forbidden to continue production on the grounds of suspected infringement of the Geneva Convention.

Dispatching equipment

The Geneva Convention allowed prisoners to receive parcels from families and relief organisations. Red Cross parcels were not used because of concerns that the enemy would not only stop these reaching the prisoners if they discovered hidden items, but also apply reprisals. Brigadier Crockatt, Hutton's chief, was very strict about this rule.

By 1940, MI9 had established that it needed to smuggle maps, currency and escape aids into the prison camps in large quantities. The tactics and concealment methods were to be developed by Hutton's small technical team in collaboration with selected suppliers of maps, compasses, escape packs, clothing and various games sets and sports equipment. Accurate record-keeping of the activities, using card indexes, also played a vital part in the work.

They invented fictitious cover organisations to ″donate″ relief parcels for dispatch to the camps. These included the Licensed Victuallers' Sports Association, the Prisoners' Leisure Hour Fund, the Ladies Knitting Circle and The Jigsaw Puzzle Club. Each of these donors had headed notepaper and realistic-looking fictitious addresses, often at blitzed premises. The black humourists included thinly-veiled encouraging texts, printed on the donors' enclosure letters. For example, a reference was made to ″The Golden Key″ in a letter enclosing books from a spoof vicarage. The Germans permitted the return of signed receipts for the parcels, facilitating the tracking of what was getting through and in what volume. At first, only genuine unmodified comfort aids were sent, so as to gauge the timing and successful receipt of consignments. Care was taken to match packing materials, such as old newspapers, with the alleged locations of the false donor organisations, and packaging was regularly altered to avoid suspicion. It took about three months for the first successes to be scored, enabling the delivery of ″naughty″ contents to begin.

One of the earliest companies to help MI9 with the printing of the silk maps had been John Waddington & Co. of Leeds. They also held the licence in the UK of the US board game, Monopoly. Hence they were able to start manufacturing the boards with items secreted in them. Using Monopoly as a host carrier also enabled actual currency to be hidden within the Monopoly money. MI9 approached EMI, the gramophone record company, who according to Hutton were at first somewhat reluctant. A standard production process involved dry lamination, which made it easier to introduce maps within the records. 

A system of coded correspondence with the camps enabled customised escape maps and currency to be produced and delivered on demand. The clue to a coded letter lay in the form of the date which, if abbreviated to numbers only, signified a coded message within the text. By December 1941, MI9 had established a network of over 900 coded letter writers in the PoW camps and the correspondence backwards and forwards between MI9 and the camps could reach over 100 in any single month. The escape kits are credited with helping 316 escape attempts from Colditz Castle, which saw 32 men make it back home, starting with Airey Neave and the Dutch officer, Toni Luteyn, who were the first officers to succeed in returning to the UK.

Opposition to Publication
According to his own account, Hutton's approach to the authorities for permission to give talks and publish his memoirs began not unpleasantly. On 4 January 1950, he wrote to the Director of Military Intelligence concerning his intentions and requesting an interview. Meanwhile, he collected examples of how WW2 escape and evasion equipment had already been publicised. This included material from the Sunday Dispatch, written in September 1945 by a Flt Lt R. Kee. Later in January, chasing up his interview request, and following it up with more evidence supporting his contention that nothing unknown would be revealed, Hutton started to find the DMI's staff less cooperative. Nevertheless, he claimed, he was given written permission on 31 January 1950, to give lectures on escape and evasion, including descriptions of the main tools such as maps, compasses and altered uniforms.

His original idea for a book written in the first half of 1950, was for it to be entitled "A journey has been arranged" and for it to include material on escapes during earlier conflicts as well as descriptions of his work in MI9. After he had completed the manuscript and had passed it to the publishers, he approached Sir Basil Embry, who was himself an escaper, to provide a foreword. But Hutton's publishers were ordered to submit the draft to an Air Ministry Intelligence Staff committee, who then decided to involve the War Office too, even though Hutton agreed to make further changes. Because of the delays, Embry wrote in his support, but as well as saying that Hutton's "revelations" were harmless, he challenged the orthodoxy that equipment used in WW2 might also be important in future conflicts. Hutton wrote that he felt "enmeshed in a labyrinth of minor officials."

He was warned in writing about infringing the Official Secrets Act, then ordered to return all documents, lecture notes and drafts concerning his service with His Majesty's Forces. In June 1951, was summonsed to court, with Embry agreeing to accompany him there. Hutton alleges that around this time he revealed to detectives some letters showing that a selection of escape aids had been sent to Buckingham Palace for the private Royal Museum. Hence the lawyers handling his case for the Director of Public Prosecutions became aware of the possibility of embarrassing high-ranking officers. The inference, in his memoirs, is that for this reason the case was withdrawn. However, his troubles were still not over.

The Air Ministry attempted to have Hutton's writings banned from publication in the US, as well as in the UK. He applied for a visa to go to the US in 1953, but permission was withheld for about three years. In November 1955 Hutton was telephoned by the Military Correspondent of the Daily Express who told him that a book entitled The Hidden Catch had just been published by an author named Charles Connell but which the correspondent recognised as an account of Hutton's own work in MI9. It transpired that the publishers had been induced to submit the draft to the Air Ministry, who redacted the text extremely heavily, removing about 66% of the content. They also insisted on the use of the alternative author, with Hutton referred to in the text as "Mr. X"! Adding insult to injury, they insisted on the insertion of a disclaimer, including the words "... dubious decisions and unorthodox behaviour ..." As a consequence, Hutton was again in court, this time at his own instigation. He sought an injunction in the High Court to block the publication and sales of further copies. Hutton won the case and was granted copyright, authorship and publication without the paragraph that he regarded as libelous. The terms were awarded on 13 January 1956.  He records the incident as having been a Pyrhhic Victory with the struggle as having "sent up my blood pressure several points."

In the final round of this dispute, Hutton instructed a solicitor to try to determine the name of the Air Ministry official who had ordered the interventions, but also, in typical fashion, he personally fired off another enraged telegram. He was interviewed by Air Ministry security officers, one of whom, he alleges, said that in the defence of Crown Secrets, even untrue "facts" could be stated! Hutton finally concluded that he "had come to the end of this particular road ..."

After eight years' official obstruction, his autobiography entitled "Official Secret" was eventually published in 1960, appearing in paperback two years later. A publisher's note follows the contents page; this includes the words:- ...it was obvious that here was a case in which we had a moral obligation to see that the author should, after years of frustration and disappointment, be allowed to tell his remarkable story and to receive recognition that had been denied to him by those who should have known better...

Final years
After the publication of "Official Secret", Hutton retired to Ashburton, Devon, on the eastern side of Dartmoor. He died at the Royal Devon and Exeter Hospital, Exeter, of a brain haemorrhage, on 3 September 1965. He was buried in Devon.

In the Media
Hutton's role during the Second World War was highlighted on the popular BBC Quiz QI (Episode 8, Series G "Germany" on 15 January 2010.)

Some silk maps were made into items such as dresses and lampshades after the war and these appear from time-to-time as minor news items and features in "collectibles" programmes.

See also
 Charles Fraser-Smith
 Jasper Maskelyne

References

Notes

Citations

Bibliography
 Bond, Barbara A. (2015). Great Escapes: The Story of MI9's Second World War Escape and Evasion Maps. Harper Collins. .
 Ellison, Wallace (1918). Escaped! Adventures in German Captivity. Edinburgh and London: W. Blackwood and Sons.
 Evans, Alfred John (1926). The Escaping Club. London: J. Lane.
 Foot, M. R. D., and Langley, J. M. (24 May 1979). MI9:  The British Secret Service That Fostered Escape and Evasion 1939–45, and Its American Counterpart. London: The Bodley Head Ltd. . .
 Hutton, Clayton (1960). Official Secret: The Remarkable Story of Escape Aids, Their Invention, Production and the Sequel. London: Max Parrish.

1893 births
1965 deaths
British Army personnel of World War II